Brasseries, Limonaderies et Malteries SARL (Bralima), established in 1923 as the Brasserie de Léopoldville, is a brewing company in the Democratic Republic of the Congo which operates six breweries. It has been owned by Heineken International since 1986. It is most notable for its flagship Primus beer but also produces various other alcoholic and non-alcoholic beverages.

Brief details
Bralima produces a wide variety of beers and other beverages, including Primus beer, Mützig, Turbo King, Guinness, alcohol-free Maltina, and many soft drinks which are bottled under license of the Coca-Cola Company.

History
After World War I, Belgian businessmen came to visit the present Democratic Republic of the Congo to evaluate opportunities to invest in the country. It was understood that the government was interested in producing beer for the local population as the beer produced by the inhabitants themselves caused major health problems. A brewery, which could brew a high quality beer, would improve the current situation. The investors decided to set up a brewery with the support of the “Société Congolaise de Banque”. On 23 October 1923 the “Brasserie de Léopoldville” (Léopoldville is now Kinshasa) was established for 4.000.000 Congolese francs. The first beer was produced on 27 December 1926. 

After 1945 the brewery expanded during an economic boom in the DRC. Stakeholders were more likely to invest, and Bralima decided to implement a decentralized structure. From 1950 to 1958 Bralima decided to retain five breweries in DR Congo: Kinshasa, Boma, Bukavu, Kisangani and Mbandaka.

Majority owned by Heineken since 1986, Bralima has attracted scrutiny for alleged links with corrupt government figures, and with rebel leaders in the long-running, ongoing civil war. Because of fraught security situations in various parts of the country, Bralima employs a private security company, Top SIG, which is a subsidiary of Saracen International, to safeguard its operations. 

Bracongo is the competitor of Bralima in the DRC.

Beers 
Primus beer; Mützig; Turbo King and Guinness under licence.

Primus beer 
Primus beer is a 5% abv lager that is brewed in Central Africa. It is brewed in Democratic Republic of the Congo, Republic of the Congo, Burundi and Rwanda.

References

External links 

Primus beer
Heineken

Breweries of Africa
Heineken subsidiaries
Coca-Cola bottlers
Drink companies of the Democratic Republic of the Congo
Manufacturing companies of the Democratic Republic of the Congo
Companies based in Kinshasa